The Snecma M88 is a French afterburning turbofan engine developed by Snecma (now known as Safran Aircraft Engines) for the Dassault Rafale fighter.

History
The program for the M88 arose from a need for a suitable propulsion system for air-superiority and ground-attack missions. In 1983, Dassault Aviation planned to produce a technology demonstrator for the Avion de Combat eXpérimental (ACX), which was expected to fly in 1986. Although the M88 was intended to be fitted to the definitive aircraft, it was not expected to be ready in time, and the ACX was therefore initially powered by the General Electric F404.

Due to the broad application of the new engine (as the aircraft was to replace considerable number of French fleet), it was necessary for the engine to have a high thrust-to-weight ratio, low fuel consumption in all flight regimes, and a long engine life. Additional considerations were afforded to good maintainability, and upgrade potential (73 kN to 105 kN using the same core). The program was officially launched in 1986. It was decided to flight test the engine, the M88-2, aboard the Dassault Breguet, and the Rafale A  prototype. Indeed, after having replaced the aircraft's left F404, the engine was first flight tested aboard the Rafale A on 27 February 1990. By then, the fourteen M88-2s had accumulated 1,600 hours of running time. The demonstrator thereafter reached supersonic speed without afterburners, reached a height of 50,000 ft, endured load factors of −2g and +9g and flown at an angle of attack of 30°. As of July 2022, M88 engine that powers Dassault Aviation’s multirole fighter has clocked up more than one million operating hours

Variants

In Production
M88-1
A four-year proof-of-concept program that preceded the M88-2.
M88-2
A  thrust variant powering the Dassault Rafale.

Proposed
M88-3
An  thrust variant for single-engine light combat aircraft. Proposed for an improved JAS-39 Gripen C military aircraft.
M88-4
A  thrust variant for heavier single-engine fighter aircraft.
M88 Pack CGP (for "total cost of ownership") or M88-4E
Based on a study contract, with development and production reported in 2008 by the General Delegation for Armament to introduce technical improvements and reduce maintenance costs. The purpose of this release is to reduce cost of ownership of the M88 and longer inspection intervals of the main modules by increasing the lifetime of the hot and rotating parts. It has been tested in flight for the first time March 22, 2010 at Istres, the Rafale's M02 CEV.
M123
Studied with General Electric Aviation to possibly replace the jointly produced CFM56 engine, the M123 added a seventh high pressure compressor (HPC) stage to the M88's six-stage HPC unit. Later known as the CFM88, the engine was a proposed powerplant for the Regioliner, the DASA/Aerospatiale/Alenia successor to the MPC 75.
M138
A turboprop variant with a core based on the M88-2 engine, intended to power the Airbus A400M transport aircraft.

Applications
Dassault Rafale

Specifications (M88-2)

See also

References

Bibliography

External links

 M88 page on Snecma's web site
  Snecma M88's pdf
 Flight Global article on M88-2

Low-bypass turbofan engines
1980s turbofan engines
M88